Rebecca Morris is a New York Times bestselling true-crime author and a TV, radio and print journalist who lives in Seattle, Washington.

Early life and education 
Morris grew up in Oregon and attended Corvallis High School. Her parents were Lucille Morris (née Sterling) and James "Jimmie" Morris, a radio and broadcast pioneer who, from 1932 to 1973, headed the early radio station KOAC, which later became Oregon Public Broadcasting. Morris studied broadcast media at Oregon State University and received a B.A. in journalism from Seattle University, and an M.F.A. in creative writing from Brown University.

Career 
She wrote about theater for The Oregonian, anchored and reported for New York Public Radio, Bloomberg Radio, New York Times Radio, CNN and Fox News, and she freelanced articles for People, Entertainment Weekly, New York Newsday, American Theatre, and the Seattle Times.

Her first book, Ted and Ann: The Mystery of a Missing Child and Her Neighbor Ted Bundy, was independently released in 2011 as a paperback by Dog Ear Publishing and re-released in 2013 as an ebook. In November 2014, "Washington's Most Wanted" featured Morris and her book on KCPQ TV in the Seattle-Tacoma area.

In 2012, she wrote the book Bad Apples about teacher sex scandals.

Bodies of Evidence, the first in a book series titled Notorious USA, which Morris co-wrote with author Gregg Olsen, was released in September 2013. With the May 2014 release of Morris and Olsen's book If I Can't Have You about the disappearance of Susan Powell, Kirkus Reviews wrote that the authors "convincingly lay out the myriad of circumstantial evidence against (suspect) Josh." The book broke news with witness accounts that revealed the Powell children might have been molested. Publishers Weekly, in its review, wrote that the authors did "a solid job depicting the heartbreaking case of Susan Powell."

A second book in the Notorious USA series, Overkill, written by Morris and Olsen, debuted at number 20 on The New York Times Best Seller list in e-book nonfiction the week of August 16, 2015.

In 2016, Morris and Olsen co-wrote A Killing in Amish Country, released by St. Martin's Press. The book outlines one of just two reported murders among the Amish in America in more than 250 years. Also, the death of Barbara Weaver marked the third known Amish murder in hundreds of years. The Philadelphia Inquirer in its review wrote that "Olsen and Morris work hard to invest the crime with jump and venality."

In 2017, Morris co-authored The Crime Book volume with American crime writers Shanna Hogan, Lee Mellor, Cathy Scott and British author Michael Kerrigan, with a foreword for the U.S. edition by Scott and the U.K. edition by author Peter James. It was released in April 2017 in the U.K. and May 2017 in the U.S. by Dorling Kindersley (Penguin Random House) as part of its Big Ideas Simply Explained series.

In February 2018, the Seattle Times received a tip from Morris about a possible Confederate flag in her neighbourhood. It turned out to be the Norwegian flag, which was hung by a local man, whose parents emigrated from Norway, to mark the start of the 2018 Winter Olympic Games and Norway's participation. TIME magazine picked up the story, headlining it "Woman Mistakes a Norwegian Flag for a Confederate One." Morris pointed to the current political climate as a possible reason for mixing up the two flags, she told the Times.

Awards 
A Killing in Amish Country was named Suspense Magazine'''s Best Books of 2016 in the true-crime category.Overkill was a New York Times bestseller in August 2015.Bodies of Evidence debuted the week of September 22, 2013 at number 16 on The New York Times Best Seller list in e-book nonfiction.

 Bibliography 
 A Murder in My Hometown (June, 2018)
 The Crime Book (co-author) (2017)
 A Killing in Amish Country: A Killing in Amish Country: Sex, Betrayal, and a Cold-Blooded Murder (July 2016)
 Overkill (True Crime Box Set, Notorious USA) (August 2015)
 If I Can't Have You: Susan Powell, Her Mysterious Disappearance, and the Murder of Her Children (May 2015)
 Ted and Ann: The Mystery of a Missing Child and Her Neighbor Ted Bundy (July 2013)
 Bodies of Evidence (True Crime Box Set, Notorious USA) (December 2013)
 Bad Apples: Inside the Teacher/Student Sex Scandal Epidemic (January 2012) (ISBN B0073XXP4U)

References

External links 
 Author's official website
 Macmillan Publishing's author bio

Living people
Writers from Corvallis, Oregon
Writers from Seattle
American non-fiction crime writers
American women journalists
Women crime writers
21st-century American women writers
20th-century American women writers
Corvallis High School (Oregon) alumni
Oregon State University alumni
Seattle University alumni
Brown University alumni
21st-century American non-fiction writers
Year of birth missing (living people)